Mona Richardson was an American-born singer and actress who had performed with Johnny Otis, Ray Charles and Ike Turner. She ended up in Australia, where she died in 1985. She released a number of singles and albums for the Philips, RCA Victor and EMI labels.

Background
Mona Richardson was a blues, jazz and soul singer. She was born in Los Angeles, California, on February 5, 1947. She came to Australia in 1980 and decided to stay. She was still in Australia when she died in 1985.

Career

1970s
Around the mid-1970s, she was being showcased at the Trophy Lounge in Las Vegas, the same venue where Judy Carp and The Rich Bono Duo appeared. In May 1967, she was in Singapore, appearing at the Shangri-La Hotel's Tiara Supper Club from the 10th to the 31st. In June 1977, Richardson was performing at the Hilton Hotel in Singapore.

In 1978, her selft-titled Mona Richardson album was released on EMI. It was produced by Swedish born Hong Kong based musician, Anders Nelsson who also contributed backing vocals.
In 1979, her Disco Dazzler album was released. It was arranged and conducted by Hong Kong producer Chris Babida who would also work on albums for Andy Bautista and Sam Sorono.

1980s
She appeared on Sharifah Aini's Just for You album, which was released in 1980. The one song she contributed to was "Reunited", which was a hit for Peaches & Herb in 1978. She came to Australia that year as part of a theatrical tour and decided to stay in the city of Melbourne. In September that year she was starring alongside Lorraine Bayly and Alfred Sandor in the stage production of The Best Little Whorehouse in Texas at Her Majesty's Theatre in New South Wales, which was directed by Jerry Yoder.

In January 1982, she was a cast member of the production Barnum which played at Adelaide's Festival Theater. She gave an impressive performance as Joice Heth in the first part. Later in the show she returned in a different form as the Blues Singer and made an impactful performance which was described by Theatre Australia magazine, "to grab the show by the scruff of the neck to strut and shake out "Black and White". Her performance was also noted by The Sydney Morning Herald and the reviewer referred to her as "a brilliant presence".

In early 1985, she had landed a regular spot at the Crab Cooker Supper Club at 482 Victoria Street, North Melbourne.

Death
She died in Melbourne Australia on August 5, 1985, as a result from falling to her death from her apartment. The cause of death was deemed to be suicide.

Discography

Stage

References

External links
 Vinyl Knights - Mona Richardson - The Original International Disco Queen
 Imagesofjazz.com: 2 pics of Mona in 1973

American blues singers
American soul singers
American jazz singers
EMI Records artists
RCA Victor artists
Philips Records artists
Suicides by jumping in Australia
1947 births
1985 suicides
20th-century African-American women singers
American emigrants to Australia